The 1905–06 season was Leeds City's second season in existence and their first season in the Football League, having competed in the West Yorkshire League during the previous season. Leeds City finished sixth in the Second Division on 43 points. They also took part in the FA Cup, where they were eliminated in the Third Qualifying Round.

Background

Season summary

Competitions

Football League Second Division

League table

Results

Source:

FA Cup

Source:

Player statistics

Appearances and goals

Goalscorers

Notes

References

Leeds City F.C. seasons
Leeds City
1900s in Leeds